Taşoluk (literally "rock trough" in Turkish) may refer to the following places in Turkey:

 Taşoluk, Bolu, a village in the district of Bolu, Bolu Province
 Taşoluk, Çine, a village in the district of Çine, Aydın Province
 Taşoluk, Kuyucak, a village in the district of Kuyucak, Aydın Province
 Taşoluk, Gülnar, a village in the district of Gülnar, Mersin Province
 Taşoluk, Sinanpaşa, a village in the district of Sinanpaşa, Afyonkarahisar Province

See also
 Taşoluk Dam